Ardjuna is a genus of snout moths. It contains the species Ardjuna kresna. It is found on northern Sumatra.

References

Pyralidae
Monotypic moth genera
Moths of Indonesia
Pyralidae genera